Berghain is a nightclub in Berlin, Germany. It is named after its location near the border between Kreuzberg and Friedrichshain in Berlin, and is a short walk from Berlin Ostbahnhof main line railway station. Founded in 2004 by friends Norbert Thormann and Michael Teufele, it has since become one of the world's most famous clubs, and has been called the "world capital of techno."

History 

Thormann and Teufele became party promoters in the 1990s, hosting a male-only fetish club night called Snax, which launched in 1992 at Bunker. In 1999 they founded their first club, Ostgut, in a former railway repair depot in Friedrichshain. Unlike Snax, the club was open to the general public. According to Deutsche Welle, Ostgut, "known for unique parties and boundless freedoms, sexual and otherwise, is considered to have paved the way for Berghain." Ostgut closed in January 2003, with the building slated for demolition and later replaced by a large indoor arena, the O2 World Berlin (since 2015: Mercedes-Benz Arena).

Berghain opened in 2004 as a reincarnation of Ostgut. The name "Berghain", a portmanteau of the two city quarters that flank the south and north sides of the building, Kreuzberg (formerly in West Berlin) and Friedrichshain (formerly in East Berlin), has been described as evocative of the club's "post-1989 identity." The literal meaning of the German word Berghain is "mountain grove."

The club is located in a former heating plant built in 1953 as part of the flagship post-war Stalinallee development and abandoned in the 1980s. The space was originally rented from the energy company Vattenfall but has been owned outright by the club since 2011. The building has a cavernous main room with 18-meter ceilings and is dominated by steel and concrete. The design of the club's interior, as well as later interior and exterior expansions of the venue, were carried out by the Berlin design firm Studio Karhard. 

In 2016, a German court officially designated Berghain a cultural institution, which allows the club to pay a reduced tax rate.

Nightclub

The club's main room is focused on techno, with a smaller upstairs space, Panorama Bar, featuring house. The basement holds a male-only establishment called "Lab.Oratory", which Rolling Stone described in 2014 as being "known as Berlin’s most extreme sex club."

Berghain has a Funktion-One sound system on its main dance floor which, when it was installed in 2004, was one of the company's largest club installs. The Panorama Bar was upgraded in 2017 with a four-point line-array system with an additional six subwoofers from Studt Akustik.

At the onset of the COVID-19 pandemic in Germany, in March 2020, Berghain closed along with all other nightclubs in Berlin. Over the summer, it hosted several sound art installations inside the building and the adjacent beer garden. In September 2020, the indoors club reopened as an art space, hosting an exhibition titled "Studio Berlin" featuring 115 Berlin-based artists including Tacita Dean, Olafur Eliasson and Wolfgang Tillmans. After 19 months, in October 2021, Berghain resumed indoor dance club events, with patrons required to either be vaccinated or have recovered from COVID-19. Since April 2022, the patrons, regardless of their vaccination status, are allowed in without masks or tests.

Culture
Berghain has become associated with decadence and hedonism. It is open continuously most weekends from Saturday night through late Monday morning. The club offers dark rooms dedicated to sexual activity, and media have frequently reported of guests openly indulging in sexual acts. In 2019 Frieze magazine observed that while in Berghain's early years, "the main room was mostly a space for gay men, [...] now its queer palette is more mixed [but] the club’s values remain the same: concealment, queerness and excess." The twice-yearly Snax Party is reserved for gay patrons.

No photos are allowed inside the club, with patrons required to cover their smartphone cameras with a sticker. The policy was maintained in 2020 when the club temporarily converted into an art space for the "Studio Berlin" exhibition during the COVID-19 pandemic. In the toilets of the club there are no mirrors, so that guests are spared the "buzzkilling indignity of seeing their own faces after an epic partying session."

A 2022 academic study described Berghain as a unique 'pharmacolibidinal constellation', where sexual orientations may become porous, and preexisting behaviors altered, owing to the environment.

The club's door policy is notorious for being both strict and opaque, generating accusations of racism and frequent debate and speculation about how to get in. Head bouncer Sven Marquardt, who is also a photographer, is a minor celebrity in the techno scene.

Record label and booking agency

In 2005, Berghain's owners started a record label, Ostgut Ton, conceived by former Ostgut resident DJ Nick Höppner after Ostgut's closure in 2003. Its first releases were by Berghain/Panorama Bar DJ residents such as Marcel Dettmann, Cassy and Ben Klock. The label's music is mostly techno, tech house, Detroit techno and minimal techno.

In 2007, Berghain collaborated with the Berlin State Ballet to create Shut Up and Dance! Updated, a ballet for five dancers that was performed at the club in late June and early July that year. The ballet's soundtrack, released on Ostgut Ton on May 29, 2007, is made up of five specially composed tracks by prominent minimal techno artists, such as Luciano, Âme, Sleeparchive and Luke Slater (The 7th Plain). The soundtrack received some positive reviews, while the ballet was less well received.

In October 2010, the label released a five-year anniversary compilation, Fünf, for which field recordings from within the club were used. Nick Höppner explained that the idea had come from his collaborator Emika on "a regular Sunday morning [at Berghain, where] she noticed how everything in the building was resonating and vibrating and swinging and humming–she realized that there were a lot of sounds coming from the building itself. That led to the idea of doing field recordings within the building while it's not open to the public."

In the same 2010 interview, Höppner stated that Ostgut Ton was turning down many recordings because there are "so many in-house artists", while the label at that time was selling more product than other labels, but not generating much profit.

Ostgut Ton closed in December 2021, having been (according to Resident Advisor) "a dominant force in dance music, beloved for its mix series and dozens of EPs, albums and compilations" for 16 years.

In 2021, ARTE Concerts produced a series of three videos at the Berghain and released it on YouTube.

Around 2007, Berghain also launched its own booking agency Ostgut Booking, which among other artists represented Ben Klock, Steffi, and Marcel Dettmann. In October 2022, it was announced that Ostgut Booking (which at the time represented 28 acts and had eight employees) would be closing down at the end of the year.

Recognition

DJ Magazine's top 100 Clubs
Berghain first entered DJ Magazine's Top 100 Clubs list in 2008, ranking 20th, and reached the top position the next year.

Position by year

International Dance Music Awards

In popular culture
 In 2013, American pop star Lady Gaga hosted an event at Berghain promoting her techno-inspired album, Artpop 
 In the TV series Sense8 one of the characters, Riley Gunnarsdóttir, played by Tuppence Middleton, is admired for a recording of a DJ set she made in Berghain. 
 In 2016, American comedian Conan O'Brien attempted to gain admission to Berghain while filming a travel episode of his television show Conan, but was denied and asked to leave due to the presence of his camera crew. 
 In 2017, the card game Bergnein was released, a satirical card game where the goal is to "Let the right people in, outshine your colleagues and win the game!"
 A character in the 2021 film The Matrix Resurrections, has a series of tattoos on his arm of the Berghain logo.
 In the 2021 television series Gossip Girl, Max Wolfe is said in the pilot episode to have visited Berghain. In his final appearance, he is shown to be thrown out of the club.
 In 2021, DJ Mag suspected that "a number of Berlin clubs have inspired Hitman III's new night time venue: Club Hölle", a virtual in-game nightclub, including "Berghain, Kraftwerk and Griessmüehle".

See also

List of electronic dance music venues
Superclub

References

External links 

 Official website
 Ostgut Ton official website
 Ostgut Ton at Discogs
 Clubguideberlin about Berghain
 BERGHAIN - Der Club in Berlin | Portrait & History 

Nightclubs in Berlin
Electronic dance music venues
LGBT nightclubs
2004 establishments in Germany